The qualification for women's football tournament at the 2004 Summer Olympics.

The following qualification tournaments were held to determine the participating nations.

Qualified teams
The following teams have qualified for the final tournament.

AFC

All matches were held in Japan.

Group A

Group B

Group C

Semifinals

Third-place match

Final

Awards

CAF

CONCACAF

Mexico and the United States earned Olympic qualification places by winning their semi-final matches.

Preliminary round

Caribbean Zone
Series A

Series B

Series C

North/Central American Zone

Group stage
Eight teams participated in the group stage. The top two teams from each group advanced to the semi-finals.

Knockout stage
The winners of the semi-finals qualified for the Olympics.

CONMEBOL
CONMEBOL did not hold the qualifying competition for the one spot but nominated , the winners of 2003 South American Women's Football Championship and 2003 Pan American Games, as the South American representative. Brazil also achieved the best performance among CONMEBOL teams at the 2003 FIFA Women's World Cup, having advanced to the quarter-finals, while the confederation's only other team, Argentina, were eliminated in the group stage.

OFC

All matches were held in Fiji.

UEFA

Due to scheduling issues, UEFA did not hold a separate qualifying competition; UEFA instead announced that the top two UEFA teams in 2003 FIFA Women's World Cup were to qualify for the Olympics. As a result, the World Cup winners  and the runners-up  qualified for the Olympics (together with the hosts ).

References

General references
 Olympic Football Tournaments Athens 2004, FIFA, retrieved on 31 March 2018.

Women's football at the 2004 Summer Olympics
AFC Women's Olympic Qualifying Tournament